Dark Storm is the third EP recorded and released by Australian four-piece musical group The Jezabels. It was released independently on 1 October 2010  ].

The EP debuted at number 40 on the ARIA Charts. 

It received the Australian Independent Record (AIR) Award for 'Best Independent Single/EP' in 2011, with The Jezabels also taking away the 'Best Independent Artist' award the same year.

The single "Mace Spray" came in at number 16 in the Triple J Hottest 100, 2010.

Track listing
All tracks written by Hayley Mary, Heather Shannon, Sam Lockwood, and Nik Kaloper

Charts

References

2010 EPs
The Jezabels albums